Austria's Next Topmodel, season 9 is the ninth season of the Austrian reality television show in which a number of women compete for the title of Austria's Next Topmodel and a chance to start their career in the modelling industry. The series returned to an all-female cast for the first time since season 5. This season will be broadcast on Puls 4.

Among with the prizes is: a contract with Vienna-based modeling agency Wiener Models, a cover of Style Up Your Life! magazine, a campaign for Leo Hillinger cosmetic, a cruise trip for two courtesy of AIDA Cruises and an Opel Corsa.

The winner of the season was 23 year old Taibeh Ahmadi from Vienna.

Contestants

Episodes

Episode 1
Original airdate: 

Challenge winners: Julia Neumeister & Verena Katrien
Bottom two: Julia Neumeister & Julie Chavanne
Eliminated: None

Episode 2
Original airdate: 

Challenge winners: Josi Jochmann & Lisa Schranz
Booked for job: Julia Neumeister 
Bottom two: Sophie Danzinger & Tamara Strasser
Quit: Tamara Strasser 
Eliminated: Sophie Danzinger
Guest judge: Oliver Stummvoll

Episode 3
Original airdate: 

Challenge winners: Rosa Oesterreicher & Valentina Kandlhofer
Bottom two: Julie Chavanne & Josi Jochmann
Eliminated: None
Guest judge: Papis Loveday

Episode 4
Original airdate: 

Challenge winners: Lisa Schranz & Rosa Oesterreicher
Bottom two: Julie Chavanne & Taibeh Ahmadi
Eliminated: Julie Chavanne
Quit: Verena Gamlich
Guest judge: Leo Hillinger

Episode 5
Original airdate: 

Booked for job: Julia Neumeister
Bottom four: Josi Jochmann, Lisa Schranz, Rosa Oesterreicher & Valentina Kandlhofer
Eliminated: Josi Jochmann
Guest judge: Vanessa von Zitzewitz

Episode 6
Original airdate: 

Bottom three: Julia Neumeister, Taibeh Ahmadi & Valentina Kandlhofer
Eliminated: None
Guest judge: Karina Sarkissova

Episode 7
Original airdate: 

Added to the cast: Baraa Bolat
Booked for job: Taibeh Ahmadi
Bottom two: Lisa Schranz & Valentina Kandlhofer
Eliminated: Lisa Schranz
Guest judge: Daniel Lismore

Episode 8
Original airdate: 

Booked for job: Rosa Oesterreicher
Bottom three: Julia Neumeister, Taibeh Ahmadi & Valentina Kandlhofer
Eliminated: Valentina Kandlhofer
Guest judge: Donatella Versace

Episode 9
Original airdate: 

Top Four: Baraa Bolat, Julia Neumeister, Rosa Oesterreicher & Taibeh Ahmadi
Eliminated: Baraa Bolat
Top Three: Julia Neumeister, Rosa Oesterreicher & Taibeh Ahmadi
Austria's Next Topmodel: Taibeh Ahmadi
Guest judges: Adi Weiss & Michael Lameraner

Results

 The contestant was in danger of elimination.
 The contestant quit the competition.
 The contestant was eliminated.

Notes

Photo shoot guide
Episode 1 photo shoot: Posing on a Formula One car with Mika Häkkinen
Episode 2 photo shoot: Sed card shoot
Episode 3 photo shoot: Gymnastics on a Diving Board
Episode 4 photo shoot: Emotions in a club
Episode 5 photo shoot: Vintage pin-up girls
Episode 6 photo shoot: Posing as elegant Ballerinas
Episode 7 photo shoot: Living Art
Episode 8 photo shoot: Posing on a Surfboard
Episode 9 photo shoot: Cover for Style Up Your Life

References

Austria's Next Topmodel
Television shows filmed in Austria
Television shows filmed in France
Television shows filmed in Monaco